Asa May House may refer to:

Asa May House (Capps, Florida), listed on the National Register of Historic Places in Jefferson County, Florida
Asa May House (West Fairlee, Vermont), listed on the National Register of Historic Places in Orange County, Vermont